Julien Laharrague (born 29 July 1978 in Tarbes, France) is a French rugby union footballer, usually playing on the wing or at fullback. He currently plays for Aironi in the Pro12 . Laharrague has also played for France.

Laharrague's first club was Béziers in which he played during the 1997–98 season, after one season with Béziers he signed with SU Agen for the following season. Laharrague then signed with Dax, where he played for the following two seasons. He returned to his first club, Béziers, and played his rugby with them for two seasons, before signing with Brive, where he played for two seasons. He then signed with USAP for the 2005–06 season.

Laharrague made his international début in a match during the 2005 Six Nations Championship, in a match against Wales on 26 February. He played in the subsequent matches against Ireland in Dublin and Italy in Rome. He made another five appearances for France that year, playing in test matches against the Springboks, Australia, Canada and Tonga. He did not play in the 2006 Six Nations Championship, but was selected for the mid-year tests against Romania and the Springboks.

On 28 February 2007, he signed a three-month deal with Sale Sharks. After this he moved back to France and on to club US Montauban.

He signed a 2-year contract with Aironi for the 2010/2011 season.

References

External links
Sale profile
Julien Laharrague, biography by L'Équipe 
Julien Laharrague, biography by USA Perpignan 

Julien Laharrague, biography from the European Rugby Cup site
Julien Laharrague, biography from sporting-heroes.net

1978 births
Living people
Sportspeople from Tarbes
French rugby union players
Rugby union fullbacks
Rugby union wings
Sale Sharks players
France international rugby union players
French expatriate sportspeople in England
French expatriate rugby union players
Expatriate rugby union players in England
SU Agen Lot-et-Garonne players
Tarbes Pyrénées Rugby players
US Dax players
USA Perpignan players
French expatriate sportspeople in Italy
Aironi players
CA Brive players
US Montauban players
FC Lourdes players
AS Béziers Hérault players
Expatriate rugby union players in Italy